Barry Cougle (born 28 May 1938) is a former Australian rules footballer who played for the Geelong Football Club in the Victorian Football League (VFL).

Notes

External links 

Living people
1938 births
Australian rules footballers from Victoria (Australia)
Geelong Football Club players
People educated at Geelong College